La Jolla Institute for Immunology is a non-profit research organization located in La Jolla, California. It is located in UC San Diego’s Research Park. The institute researches immunology and immune system diseases. The institute employs 220 M.D.s and Ph.D.s, including 23 faculty members and more than 450 employees. Dr. Mitchell Kronenberg has served as its president and scientific director since 2003. The institute was founded in 1988.

La Jolla Institute for Immunology is a collaborative research organization that has forged many partnerships within the research community in San Diego, across the United States, and abroad. The institute's biomedical research facility covers 145,000 square feet inclusive of specialized research rooms suited for all aspects of molecular and cellular biology.

History
La Jolla Institute for Immunology was established in 1988 by a coalition that included Makoto Nonaka, the institute's founding president, and Kimishige Ishizaka, the institute's first scientific director.

In 1989 the institute began its laboratory operations with the arrival of two immunologists, Kimishige Ishizaka and Teruko Ishizaka, from Johns Hopkins University in Baltimore, Maryland. The Ishizakas were co-discoverers in 1966 of the IgE (immunoglobulin E) protein, a molecule that induces allergic reactions in the human body. In 1991, Kimishige Ishizaka was appointed president and scientific director of the institute and served in the role until his retirement in 1995.

In 1995, Howard Grey joined La Jolla Institute of Immunology as president and scientific director. During the next several years, the institute recruited prominent faculty members and formulated a program to accelerate the commercial development of LJI's research and drug discoveries. In 1996, the institute moved from its initial location on Torrey Pines Road in La Jolla to a new purpose-built facility on Science Center Drive on the Torrey Pines Mesa.

In 2003, Mitchell Kronenberg was appointed president and scientific director. That same year, the Immune Epitope Database (IEDB) was established and launched. The database was designed and developed by the La Jolla Institute under a competitive contract from the National Institute of Allergy and Infectious Diseases (NIAID), part of the NIH. In 2012, the NIH renewed their contract with the institute for a further seven years.

In 2006 the institute opened a new research facility located in the new UC San Diego Science Research Park. In 2011, the institute opened the RNAi Center for Identifying Genetic Triggers of Disease. The center's goal is to propel scientific efforts to pinpoint the specific genes involved in causing immune diseases, cancer, and other diseases using RNA interference (RNAi) technology. That same year, the La Jolla Institute and Immunology became the fifth collaborating organization to join the Sanford Consortium for Regenerative Medicine.

In 2013 La Jolla Institute extended its partnership with the Japanese pharmaceutical company Kyowa Hakko Kirin. The six-year agreement continues a research alliance that began in 1988. In 2015 the La Jolla Institute for Immunology announced its affiliation with the UC San Diego Health System.

In 2018, the La Jolla Institute for Allergy and Immunology changed its name to La Jolla Institute for Immunology to reflect its current focus.

In 2020, scientists at the institute formed a Coronavirus Task Force in response to the COVID-19 pandemic. At the same time, the institute became the home of the Coronavirus Immunotherapy Consortium (CoVIC), a research collaboration to test antibodies against the novel coronavirus, SARS-CoV-2, led by structural virologist Erica Ollmann Saphire.

Scientific activities 

Scientists at La Jolla Institute for Immunology study the fundamental workings of the immune system. This includes studying the cells driving allergies and autoimmune diseases, as well as the cells that aim to fight cancers and infectious diseases. The institute is made up of three centers: the Center for Autoimmunity and Inflammation, the Center for Cancer Immunotherapy and the Center for Infectious Disease and Vaccine Research.

Scientists at LJI also lead research into genomic sequencing of immune cells and high-resolution imaging of virus/antibody interactions through cryo-electron microscopy. The institute is home to the Immune Epitope Database (IEDB) and the DICE (Database of Immune Cell Expression, Expression of quantitative trait loci and Epigenomics).

Scientists at LJI, in collaboration with researchers at the J. Craig Venter Institute, were the first to publish an analysis of potential SARS-CoV-2 epitopes vulnerable to the human immune system. Since then, COVID-19 research at LJI has shed light on how both CD+8 and CD+4 T cells respond to the SARS-CoV-2 virus. These findings can inform vaccine efforts. Scientists at the institute have analyzed mutations in the SARS-CoV-2 virus. Additional COVID-19 projects at the institute include research to understand how the virus affects white blood cells called monocytes and research into Multisystem inflammatory syndrome in children (MIS-C).

Researchers at LJI have established several international research partnerships, including research collaborations in Nepal to study flavivirus infection and collaborations in Sierra Leone to study hemorrhagic fever viruses.

References

External links
 Home Page

Allergy organizations
Institute For Allergy And Immunology
Medical research institutes in the United States
Medical and health organizations based in California
Organizations based in San Diego